Kyle Williams (born 4 October 1987) is an association football player from The Bahamas who currently plays for Bears.

Club career
He played for the Bowling Green Falcons in 2005 and 2006 and joined the University of Tampa in 2008.

He played for the Bradenton Academics of the Premier Development League during the summer of 2009.

International career
Williams made his debut for the Bahamas in a June 2008 World Cup qualification match against  Jamaica. He also played in the return match, his only caps earned so far.

Personal life
Williams works in banking.

References

External links
 Bio - Tampa Spartans
 Bio - BGSU Falcons
 

1987 births
Living people
Sportspeople from Nassau, Bahamas
Association football defenders
Bahamian footballers
Bahamas international footballers
Bowling Green Falcons men's soccer players
Tampa Spartans men's soccer players
Bears FC players
Bahamian expatriate footballers
Expatriate soccer players in the United States
Bahamian expatriate sportspeople in the United States